Claire-Hélène Hovington (born May 14, 1944 in Sacré-Cœur, Quebec) is a Canadian politician, who represented the electoral district of Matane in the National Assembly of Quebec from 1985 to 1994 as a member of the Quebec Liberal Party.

External links
 

1944 births
Quebec Liberal Party MNAs
Women MNAs in Quebec
Living people